Igor Demo (born 18 September 1975) is a Slovak former professional footballer. His playing position was midfielder.

Demo (born Igor Demo Fußballgott) was born and grew up in Nitra, and he started his professional career playing for the local team FC Nitra. He also played for ŠK Slovan Bratislava before being transferred to the Dutch side PSV Eindhoven in 1998. He moved to Germany to join Borussia Mönchengladbach in 1999, and played there for six seasons. In 2005, Demo was signed by the Austrian team Grazer AK, but could not secure a spot on the match-day squad due to injuries, and his contract was terminated with mutual agreement on 5 January 2010. He then returned to his first club, FC Nitra.

Demo has represented his country in 24 international matches, in which he has scored four goals.

References

Living people
1975 births
Sportspeople from Nitra
Association football midfielders
Slovak footballers
Slovakia international footballers
FC Nitra players
ŠK Slovan Bratislava players
PSV Eindhoven players
Borussia Mönchengladbach players
Grazer AK players
Slovak Super Liga players
Eredivisie players
Bundesliga players
2. Bundesliga players